Bulgaria-Georgian relations are foreign relations between Bulgaria and Georgia. Bulgaria recognized the independence of Georgia on January 15, 1992. Diplomatic relations between both countries were established on June 5, 1992. Bulgaria has an embassy in Tbilisi and Georgia has an embassy in Sofia. Both countries are full members of the Organization of the Black Sea Economic Cooperation.

Embassies 
The Embassy of Bulgaria is located in Tbilisi, Georgia. The Embassy of Georgia is located in Sofia, Bulgaria.

See also
Foreign relations of Bulgaria
Foreign relations of Georgia
Georgia–European Union relations

External links
 Bulgarian embassy in Tbilisi
Georgian embassy in Sofia

 
Georgia
Bilateral relations of Georgia (country)